Colin Neil Crompton (16 August 1937 – 11 December 2003) was an Australian rules footballer who played for Melbourne in the Victorian Football League (VFL).

Crompton usually played in the back pocket and thus did not kick many goals however it is for a goal he kicked in Melbourne's 1964 Grand Final win over Collingwood that he is most remembered for. With Melbourne trailing and just minutes remaining in the game, Crompton had followed his Collingwood opponent up the ground and managed to pick up a loose ball in front of goal. He kicked the ball low towards goal and it floated through for his only goal of the season and gave Melbourne the lead. It was the last goal of the match.

He also played cricket for Victoria during the early part of his career, appearing in 45 first-class matches for them between 1957 and 1962.

Crompton also played 18 games (37 goals) for Glenelg (SANFL) in 1961.

His later sporting career included a number of years coaching Oakleigh in the Victorian Football Association in the late 1970s and early 1980s.

See also
 List of Victoria first-class cricketers

References

External links

CricketArchive profile

1937 births
2003 deaths
Melbourne Football Club players
Werribee Football Club players
Werribee Football Club coaches
Oakleigh Football Club coaches
Glenelg Football Club players
Ormond Amateur Football Club players
Australian cricketers
Victoria cricketers
Melbourne Cricket Club cricketers
Australian rules footballers from Melbourne
Cricketers from Melbourne
Melbourne Football Club Premiership players
One-time VFL/AFL Premiership players
People from Dandenong, Victoria